Lively Technical College is a public technical training school for both adult and high school students, located in Tallahassee, Florida, United States. It occupies two sites, including the main campus at 500 Appleyard Drive, and the campuses at Tallahassee International Airport. The main campus on Appleyard is located adjacent to Tallahassee Community College, but the two are separate institutions. Lively Tech is operated by the Leon County Schools district.

References

External links
 Official website

Public universities and colleges in Florida
High schools in Leon County, Florida
Schools in Tallahassee, Florida
Educational institutions established in 1937
Public high schools in Florida
Universities and colleges accredited by the Council on Occupational Education
1937 establishments in Florida